Rajesharyarpur or Sharyarpur, is a town in Ambedkar Nagar district in the Indian state of Uttar Pradesh. Rajesharyarpur is 1 km from Rajesultanpur city.

References

Cities and towns in Ambedkar Nagar district